Jarosław Edward Suchoples is a Polish historian, serving as an ambassador to Finland (2017–2019).

Life 
Jarosław Suchoples holds an M.A. in history from the University of Gdańsk. Following doctorate studies there, in 2000, he defended his Ph.D. thesis at the Department of History, University of Helsinki. His doctoral advisor was Matti Klinge. He has been studying also at the University of California, Berkeley (2001–2002).

Between 2000 and 2002 he was working as an analyst at the Polish Institute of International Affairs. He has been lecturer at the Humboldt University of Berlin (2003–2004), Free University of Berlin (2003–2005), University of Wrocław (2003–2005), University of Warmia and Mazury in Olsztyn (2007–2008), and University of Szczecin (2008–2013). Between 2013 and 2015 he was associate professor of the European studies at the National University of Malaysia. He authored several articles on Finland, Baltic Sea region, history of World War I, and World War II.

From 5 September 2017 to 31 March 2019, Suchoples was representing Poland as an ambassador to Finland.

Beside Polish, Suchoples speaks English, German, Russian, and Finnish. Married to Katarzyna Stachura-Suchoples. They have a daughter.

Works 

 Finland 1917–1918 in the documents of the US Department of State, Wrocław: Atut, 2007.
 Finlandia w polityce Stanów Zjednoczonych 1917–1919, Warszawa: Trio, 2002.
 Finland and the United States 1917-1919: The Early Years of Mutual Relations, Finnish Literature Society, 2001.

References 

1969 births
Academic staff of the National University of Malaysia
Academic staff of the University of Helsinki
Ambassadors of Poland to Finland
Historians of Finland
Living people
21st-century Polish historians
Polish male non-fiction writers
University of Gdańsk alumni
Academic staff of the University of Gdańsk
University of Helsinki alumni
Academic staff of the University of Szczecin
Diplomats from Gdańsk